Worldwide may refer to:

 Pertaining to the entire world
 Worldwide (rapper) (born 1986), American rapper
 Pitbull (rapper) (born 1981), also known as Mr. Worldwide, American rapper
 Worldwide (Audio Adrenaline album), 2003
 Worldwide (The Death Set album), 2016
 Worldwide (Everything but the Girl album), 1991
 "Worldwide" (song), a 2011 song by Big Time Rush from BTR
 "World Wide (Remix)", a song by Outlawz from Novakane, 2001
 World-Wide Shipping, a Hong Kong-based shipping company that merged with Norwegian company Bergesen to form BW Group
 Worldwide magazine, a magazine for the Austin Motor Company by the in-house Nuffield Press

See also
 Cosmopolitanism
 International (disambiguation)
 Global (disambiguation)
 World (disambiguation)